Alexandre Franquet (28 June 1828 in Songy – 25 August 1907 in Lorient) was a French Navy officer. He was in command during the Battle of Havana, the most significant naval engagement of the Franco-Prussian War.

Biography 

Franquet joined the École navale in October 1843. He took part in the Crimean War, serving on the corvette Galatée and the gunboat Lance (1854–1855) with the rank of Ensigne. He then took part in campaigns in China (1858–1860) on Didon and Primauguet.

During the Franco-Prussian War, with the rank of capitaine de frégate, he was in command of the aviso Bouvet. On 9 November 1870, he fought the German gunboat Meteor off Havana. Following the inconclusive engagement, he was promoted to capitaine de vaisseau. In June 1881, he rose to contre-amiral and took command of the squadron based in Algeria. Promoted to vice-amiral in February 1888, he was appointed Maritime Prefect in Rochefort in September 1892. He retired in June 1893.

Honours 
 Commandeur of the Legion of Honour on 28 December 1884, Grand Officier on 10 July 1890. 
 Médaille de Crimée

References 

 

French military personnel of the Franco-Prussian War
École Navale alumni
French Navy admirals
1828 births
1907 deaths